MACIF (Mutuelle assurance des commerçants et industriels de France et des cadres et des salariés de l'industrie et du commerce) is a French mutual insurance company. It was founded in 1960 in Niort.

When its founder Jacques Vandier (1927–2020) retired in 1997 he asserted that it was the largest mutual motor insurance company in France: "Je suis parti de zéro. Avec quelques autres, j'ai fait de la Macif la première mutuelle d'assurances automobile en France."

References

External links

Insurance companies of France
1960 establishments in France